Jørgen Friis til Krastrup was a Danish lord and Governor-general of Norway from 1601 to 1608. He was probably born in Nes Castle, Denmark and died in 1616 in Skørping. His father Ivar Friis (died 1557) was the lord at Nes, and his mother was Sophie Andersdatter Glob (died after 1574). He was married three times, first on 2 August 1573 with Anne Pallesdatter Juel (died 19 December 1576), daughter of Palle Juel til Pallesbjerg (died 1585), the judge in Nordjylland and Anne Lykke (died 1585). His second marriage was to Else Bjørnsdatter (27 March 1558 – 9 October 1594),  daughter of national counselor Bjørn Andersen of Bjørnsholm (1532–1583) and Sidsel Truidsdatter Ulfstand (died 1561). His third  marriage was to Lisbeth Christoffersdatter Galle (died 1616), daughter of the lord of Steinvikholm, Christoffer Galle (died 1555) and Birte Clausdatter Bille (1534–1613). She served as Acting County Sheriff of the County of Vinstrupgård, Denmark, taking charge of the tenantry after the death of her first husband, Eggert Ulfeldt. She and Jørgen Friis were buried on the same day in 1616.

The Danish nobility of the period had secured to themselves a monopoly on a number of administrative offices; this preference continued until 1620. Jørgen Friis was a member of that small class of upper nobility whose members could aspire to the highest positions in Denmark-Norway, including membership on the national council (riksråd).  He became Governor-general of Norway (statholder) in 1601 and initiated a major effort to revise the Norwegian law.  His activity led to issuance of Christian IV’s Norwegian Law of 1604, which as essentially a translation into Danish of the older Norwegian law of Magnus law-mender established and recorded in Norwegian in 1274 and 1276.

Early life
Friis belonged to an early noble line from southern Jutland, which has been traced back to at least the mid 1300-century, based on the earliest recording of their coat-of-arms. The family belonged to the leading noble circles in Jutland, and Jørgen Friis had an upbringing that was common for young men of his standing. As a young man he experienced military action when in 1576 he served in the king’s retinue during a campaign into Mecklenburg.

Career

Friis followed the traditional early career path of a nobleman, with service at court and as a court Junker in 1578. In 1580s-90s he served with various smaller  in Denmark, and 1595, he became a judge in North Jutland, which provided him a good knowledge of the law and its interpretation. He achieved the highest rank in 1596, when he was named to the national council (riksråd).

In 1601 he was granted Norway's most important fief, Akershus, as well as the position of Governor-general of Norway. Friis served as Governor-general of Norway until 1608, when he returned to Denmark, where he was granted the far less labor-intensive Seilstrup fief, which he held until his death. When he assumed the role of Governor-general (statholder) from Axel Gyldenstjerne, Christian IV was present in Norway. Friis had to pledge that we would "listen and pay diligent heed to the complaints of the common people and help them secure justice."

His most important contributions were in translating and organizing the law. The Danish administrators found it absolutely necessary to recast the old Norwegian law, which was written in old Norse and difficult for them to interpret and apply. Moreover, there were newer laws that were not properly entered into the older documented law record.  As early as 1557 Christian III had directed a revision of the Norwegian laws, without success. Frederick II had also directed a revision of the law in 1572, without success.  Yet another royal direction to translate the laws and add provisions for fines had been addressed to the governor, Axel Gyldenstierne, in 1592.

Christian IV was one of the most remarkable of the Danish-Norwegian kings, having initiated many reforms and projects in both Denmark and Norway. He visited  Norway 26 times, more times than all his predecessors combined, and became aware of the egregious abuses of the law by fief holders like Ludvig Munk. In 1602 Christian IV resided in Akershus, reviewed the need to revise the laws, and the governor-general Jørgen Friis, with the support of Anders Green and various men of the law, was commanded to prepare a new law book. Under the eye of the king, the commission work quickly, and the new law book, which was printed in 1604, entered into force in January 1605 under the name, KONG CHRISTIAN DEN FJERDES NORSKE LOVBOG af 1604.

Friis' work on the Norwegian law was of great importance, since it produced a law book which was better suited to conditions that existed at that time in Scandinavia. As is common with the law, it had to be updated multiple times, including revisions by Jens Bjelke, but it served as the essential source of law until it was superseded by kong Christian 5s Norske Lov av 1687 (King Christian V’s Norwegian Law of 1687).

Other interests
Most of Friis' labor went to managing the numerous fiefs for which he was responsible. He also devoted attention to his personal interests. He had inherited Krastrup manor in North Jutland from his mother. The manor house at Krastrup burned in 1612, but was restored at Jørgen Friis’ direction.

With his three wives Jørgen Friis fathered 12 children, of whom 8 were sons. One of them was chancellor Christen Friis of Kragerup (1581-1639); several of the other sons died during their educational trips in Europe.

References

1616 deaths
16th-century Danish nobility
17th-century Danish nobility
Governors-general of Norway
16th-century Danish people
16th-century Norwegian nobility
17th-century Norwegian nobility
Year of birth unknown
Friis family